Derecikören can refer to the following villages in Turkey:

 Derecikören, Çaycuma
 Derecikören, Gölpazarı
 Derecikören, Sındırgı